The 2017–18 New Zealand Women's Twenty20 Competition was the eleventh season of the women's Twenty20 cricket competition played in New Zealand. It ran from November 2017 to February 2018, with 6 provincial teams taking part. Wellington Blaze topped the group with 7 wins to win their 4th Twenty20 title.

The tournament ran alongside the 2017–18 Hallyburton Johnstone Shield.

Competition format 
Teams played in a double round-robin in a group of six, therefore playing 10 matches overall. Matches were played using a Twenty20 format. The team that topped the group were named the Champions.

The group worked on a points system with positions being based on the total points. Points were awarded as follows:

Win: 4 points 
Tie: 2 points 
Loss: 0 points.
Abandoned/No Result: 2 points.

Points table

Source: ESPN Cricinfo

Statistics

Most runs

Source: ESPN Cricinfo

Most wickets

Source: ESPN Cricinfo

References

External links
 Series home at ESPN Cricinfo

Super Smash (cricket)
2017–18 New Zealand cricket season
New Zealand Women's Twenty20 Competition